Caroline van Dommelen (9 November 1874 – 4 March 1957) was a Dutch film actress and director of the silent era. She appeared in 11 films between 1911 and 1918, and directed three during this time period. Several of her family members — including her brother, Jan van Dommelen — were involved in filmmaking.

Filmography
 Ontrouw (1911)
 De bannelingen (1911)
 Vrouwenoogen (1912)
 Roze Kate (1912)
 Don Juan (1913)
 Silvia Silombra (1913)
 Het geheim van het slot arco (1915)
 Een danstragedie (1916)
 Oorlog en vrede - 1914 (1918)
 Oorlog en vrede - 1916 (1918)
 Oorlog en vrede - 1918 (1918)

References

External links

Caroline Van Dommelen  at the Women Film Pioneers Project

1874 births
1957 deaths
Dutch film actresses
Dutch silent film actresses
Dutch film directors
Dutch women film directors
Dutch women screenwriters
Dutch screenwriters
Actors from Rotterdam
Women film pioneers
20th-century Dutch actresses
20th-century screenwriters
Mass media people from Rotterdam